Edward Sullivan Murphy PC(NI) KC (3 February 1880 – 3 December 1945) was an Irish barrister, judge and politician.  He was brother-in-law to the first Lord Chief Justice of Northern Ireland, Sir Denis Henry, Bt. (they both married daughters of Lord Justice Hugh Holmes).

He was the fourth son of James Murphy (1823-1901), judge of the High Court of Justice in Ireland, and Mary Keogh, daughter of William Keogh, judge of the Court of Common Pleas (Ireland) and Kate Rooney.

He was educated at Charterhouse School, Surrey, and Trinity College, Dublin where he studied Classics. He was called to the Irish Bar in 1903 and the English Bar in 1921.

He was elected to the Northern Ireland Senate as an Ulster Unionist Party member on 22 March 1929, but resigned on 11 April of the same year in order to contest the City of Londonderry seat at the 1929 Northern Ireland general election. He thus had the shortest term of any Senator in Northern Ireland.

Murphy won the seat, and held it at subsequent elections. He served as Attorney General for Northern Ireland from 1937–1939, and resigned from the office and from Parliament upon appointment as a Lord Justice of Appeal in Northern Ireland in 1939, as which he served until his death.

His first wife Alice Holmes died in 1942; he remarried Mary Craig Buchanan.

References

External links
 

1880 births
1945 deaths
People educated at Charterhouse School
Alumni of Trinity College Dublin
Irish barristers
Ulster Unionist Party members of the House of Commons of Northern Ireland
Members of the Senate of Northern Ireland 1925–1929
Members of the House of Commons of Northern Ireland 1929–1933
Members of the House of Commons of Northern Ireland 1933–1938
Members of the House of Commons of Northern Ireland 1938–1945
Members of the Privy Council of Northern Ireland
Attorneys General for Northern Ireland
Northern Ireland junior government ministers (Parliament of Northern Ireland)
Lords Justice of Appeal of Northern Ireland
Members of the House of Commons of Northern Ireland for County Londonderry constituencies
Ulster Unionist Party members of the Senate of Northern Ireland